Jaco may refer to:

Places
Jaco Island, island of East Timor
Jacó, Costa Rica, a town in Western Costa Rica
Jaco, West Virginia

Animals
 Jaco is the local name for the Dominican endemic red-necked amazon parrot
 Usual name for the grey parrot in a number of languages

Arts and entertainment
Jaco, a 2014 American documentary film about Jaco Pastorius
Jaco, a 1974 jazz album by Jaco Pastorius et al.
Jaco the Galactic Patrolman, Japanese manga series

People

Nickname
Jaco (born 1932), Jacob Azafrani Beliti, Moroccan footballer
Jacó (born 1996), Carlos Alberto Guimaraes Filho, Brazilian footballer

Given name
"Jaco" is a common Afrikaans form of Jacob and James. Some of the better known people with this name include:
Jaco Ahlers (born 1987), South African golfer
Jaco Engelbrecht (born 1987), South African shot putter
Jaco Erasmus (born 1979), South African-born Italian rugby player
Jaco Kriel (born 1989), South African rugby player
Jaco Pastorius (1951–1987), American jazz musician
Jaco Peyper (born 1980), South African rugby referee
Jaco Van Dormael (born 1957), Belgian film director, screenwriter and playwright
Jaco Venter (born 1987), South African racing cyclist
Jaco van der Westhuyzen (born 1978), South African rugby player
Jaco van Zyl (born 1971),  South African golfer

Surname
Charles Jaco (born 1950), American newscaster and radio personality
David Jaco (born 1954), American boxer
Wasalu Muhammad Jaco (born 1982), Chicago rapper better known as "Lupe Fiasco"
William Jaco (born 1940), American mathematician

Dutch masculine given names